All Saints' Church is located in the village of Ashbocking near Ipswich. It is an active Anglican parish church in the deanery of Woodbridge, part of the archdeaconry of Ipswich, and the Diocese of St Edmundsbury and Ipswich.

There is mention of a church being in the village of Ashbocking in the Domesday Book of 1086. Parts of the present church date from between the 13th and 14th centuries.

All Saints' Church was listed at Grade I on 9 December 1955.

See also 
Grade I listed buildings in Suffolk

References 

Church of England church buildings in Suffolk
1955 establishments in England
Grade I listed churches in Suffolk
Mid Suffolk District